Center peel, "Australian peel", or simply "peel" for short, is a type of retreat practiced by modern-day infantry. This particular tactic is more specifically designed for situations where smaller groups of infantry withdraw from an engagement of a much larger force.  In general terms, it is a sloped or diagonal retreat from the enemy.

Definition
This tactic was designed with human psychology in mind. It begins with an infantry unit facing off with a larger force of enemies. Once the command is called, the soldiers implement a column facing into the enemy's midst. The soldiers then begin, or continue, to use suppressing fire to delay the enemy's attack and advance. Depending on the direction of the retreat, the second to last soldier on the farmost end, opposite the retreating direction, calls out, "Peel one". Next, the infantryman next to him, on the end of the column, ceases fire, works his way behind the column towards the other side, takes a position one meter diagonally back from the farthest soldier on this side, and resumes suppressing fire. Then, the process repeats with the commands being simplified to "peel", the "one" only there to signify the actual start of the tactic, and continues until the party has safely disengaged the target.  

The slanting motion of the tactic gives the impression of increasing numbers of infantry joining the battle, a psychological move designed to deter the opposition. The slanting motion also has the benefit of keeping open one's field of fire. Retreating directly backwards would put the soldier too closely behind his own men, severely limiting his/her field of fire. 

In the Canadian Army, this technique is referred to as an "Aussie Peelback". 

In the Australian Army this tactic is known as "The Tunnel of Love" and is often used as the first part of "Break Contact" drills for small reconnaissance and special forces patrols when encountering larger enemy forces.

References in film and literature
The center peel tactic was demonstrated in the final gunfight of the 2003 movie, Tears of the Sun, where Lieutenant Waters (Bruce Willis) directs his men away from a significantly larger group of aggressive Nigerian troops.

This tactic was also shown in episode 6 of season 2 of the Amazon Prime show, Jack Ryan, where a small group of 3 soldiers were ambushed in a ravine.

The peel tactic can also be seen in the 1995 film Heat as the LAPD intercept the heist crew as they are leaving the bank.

See also 
Fire and movement
Bounding overwatch
Overwatch (military tactic)
Siege

References

Center peel